The Organización Miss América Latina, known in English as the Miss Latin America Organization is a company that owns and organizes the Miss Latin America and Miss Latina US pageants. The organization was founded in the 1980s.  The first pageant established was the Miss Latin America, in 1981. Miss Latina US was founded as Miss Latina USA in 1986, and is the official national preliminary for the United States to Miss Latin America.  Miss Teen US Latina was founded in 2003.

Titleholders

The following is a list of the titleholders for the Miss Latin America Organization, spanning back to Miss Latin America 1981.

Notes

* In 2007, Silva was dethroned by the Miss Latin America Organization and replaced by Garcia, the first runner-up.

** Taranco wasn't actually crowned Miss Teen US Latina, but rather won the title Miss Teen Florida Latina, the first teenage pageant associated with the Miss Latin America Organization.

*** For one various reason or another, Lorenia Burruel, Priscila Furlan, Jeannette Chavez, and Aline Resende had their titles expanded for another year.

**** No Miss Latina USA 1996 was organized.  Rather, a panel of judges chose Iris Almario, the first runner-up at Miss Latina USA 1993, to represent the United States at Miss Latin America 1996.

+ Fatima Leonardo was selected to represent the United States at Miss Latin America 2008.  She had won the state title for Rhode Island already, and was selected amongst those who were going to compete at Miss Latina US 2008, which had been postponed to after Miss Latin America 2008.

References

External links
Official Miss Latina US Website
Official Miss Latin America Website (Spanish)

Miss América Latina
Beauty organisations